The 2018 FIBA Under-17 Women's Basketball World Cup (Belarusian: Кубак свету па баскетболе сярод жанчын да 17 гадоў ФІБА 2018) was an international basketball competition held from 21 to 29 July 2018 in Minsk, Belarus. It was the fifth edition of the FIBA Under-17 Women's Basketball World Cup. Sixteen national teams competed in the tournament.

The United States won their fourth title after defeating France in the final.

Venues

Qualified teams

Preliminary round
The draw ceremony was held on 6 March 2018.

Group A

Group B

Group C

Group D

Final round

Bracket

Round of 16

9–16th classification playoffs

9–16th place quarterfinals

13–16th place semifinals

15th place game

13th place game

9–12th place semifinals

Eleventh place game

Ninth place game

Quarterfinals

5–8th classification playoffs

5–8th place semifinals

Seventh place game

Fifth place game

Semifinals

Third place game

Final

Final standings

Statistics and awards

Statistical leaders

Points

Rebounds

Assists

Blocks

Steals

Awards

Most Valuable Player
 Jordan Horston

All-Tournament Team
 Jordan Horston
 Haley Jones
 Aliyah Boston
 Shyla Heal
 Iliana Rupert

References

External links
 Official website

2018
FIBA Under-17 World Championship for Women
2018 in youth sport
International women's basketball competitions hosted by Belarus
International youth basketball competitions hosted by Belarus
2018
2018 in women's basketball
2018 in Belarusian sport